Bonosus was a Bishop of Sardica in the latter part of the fourth century, who taught against the doctrine of the perpetual virginity of Mary. His followers were later labelled "Bonosians" and considered heretical. 

The council of Capua (391) condemned Bonosus and tried to excommunicate him, but Bonosus did not stop using his episcopal functions. The Bonosians would rebaptize converts

After the condemnation of Bonosus he started his own sect.

See also 
Antidicomarianites, Christians who denied the perpetual virginity of Mary
Helvidius
Jovinian

References

Sources

4th-century bishops in the Roman Empire